Levin Hicks Campbell Jr. (November 23, 1886 – November 17, 1976) was a lieutenant general in the United States Army. He was the 16th Chief of Ordnance for the U.S. Army Ordnance Corps.

Biography
The son of U.S. Court of Patent Appeals Judge Levin Hicks Campbell Sr. (1860–1955), Levin Hicks Campbell Jr. was born on November 23, 1886, in Washington, D.C. He graduated from the U.S. Naval Academy in 1909. Upon graduation, he resigned from the Navy and accepted a job with United States Steel. In 1911, he joined the Army and was commissioned as a second lieutenant in the Army's Coast Artillery. Campbell's first Ordnance assignment came as a captain in April 1918 when he served in the Office of the Chief of Ordnance during World War I.

After the war Campbell continued his service in the Ordnance Branch; including assignments at: the Office of the Chief of Ordnance, Washington, D.C.; Stockton Ordnance Depot, Stockton, California; Aberdeen Proving Ground, Maryland; and Rock Island Arsenal, Illinois. As a career Ordnance officer, he specialized in the engineering and production of combat vehicles, small arms, artillery, and ammunition. He was commended for successfully automating the artillery ammunition assembly line at Frankford Arsenal, Pennsylvania while assigned there from 1939 to 1940.

In 1940, Campbell was promoted to brigadier general and appointed Assistant Chief of Ordnance for Facilities, where he supervised the planning and construction of new munitions factories across the country, particularly for the production and chemicals and explosives, and the loading of ammunition. Most were built by the government and operated under contract for the Ordnance Department. In January 1942, he was placed in charge of all industrial production and was promoted to Major General in Spring 1942.

On June 1, 1942, Campbell was named as the 16th Chief of Ordnance. Among his major accomplishments in that post was the development of what he called the 'Industry-Ordnance Team'. To improve manufacturing techniques, Campbell brought in some of the best people from science and industry. The development, production, and maintenance of Army Ordnance became a $30 billion-a-year industry during World War II. By decentralizing his department's administrative structure, Campbell was able to overcome many of the unprecedented difficulties faced by the Ordnance Department in its responsibilities to arm and equip the Army in World War II.

Given the temporary rank of Lieutenant General in April 1946, Campbell retired as a Major General in May 1946. He was advanced to Lieutenant General on the retired list in June 1948. Campbell's decorations included two awards of the Distinguished Service Medal. He wrote The Industry-Ordnance Team in 1946 recounting the Allied effort to produce and deliver weapons, vehicles, and munitions for World War II.

After his military retirement, Campbell was involved with several civilian businesses, including appointment as Executive Vice President of the International Harvester company in Chicago, Illinois and serving on the boards of directors of the Curtiss-Wright Corporation and American Steel Foundries.  He was also chairman of the Board of Trustees of the Automotive Safety Foundation.

General Campbell died in Annapolis, Maryland on November 17, 1976.  He was buried in Section 02, Lot 0336 of the United States Naval Academy Cemetery in Annapolis, Maryland.

In 1972 Campbell was inducted into the Ordnance Corps Hall of Fame. The U.S. Army Ordnance Corps Association's Levin Hicks Campbell Jr. Distinguished Award of Merit is named for him.

References

Sources
U. S. Army Register, published by U.S. Army Adjutant General's Office, 1911, page 643
Army List and Directory, published by U.S. Army Adjutant General's Office, 1919, page 77
The Story of Ordnance in the World War, by Sevellon Brown, 1920, page 153
Newspaper article, Give Dinner for Major Campbell, Davenport (Iowa) Democrat And Leader, May 26, 1927
Magazine article, Army Chief for Ordnance, Time Magazine, June 1, 1942
Newspaper article, Gen. Campbell is Nominated Army Ordnance Chief, Chicago Tribune, May 21, 1942
Historic American Engineering Record (HAER), Ford's Richmond Assembly Plant, Chapter 4, http://www.rosietheriveter.org/FordBldgReport/Chapter4WWIIPart1.pdf
Newspaper article, U.S. Rocket Developed: We Surpass Germans in Work on Weapon, The New York Times, December 17, 1943
Newspaper article, Joins American Steel Foundries, New York Times, November 21, 1948
Military Times, Hall of Valor, List of Recipients of the Distinguished Service Medal, https://web.archive.org/web/20120525055629/http://homeofheroes.com/valor/02_awards/index_dsm/00_armyDSM-index.html
Pentagon Politics, by William Haynie Neblett, 1953, page 34
Who's Who in Commerce and Industry, 1953, Volume 9, page 242
Newspaper article, Retired General Elected To Curtiss-Wright Board, The New York Times, April 25, 1952
Traffic Digest and Review Magazine, 1953, Volumes 1 and 2, page 20
Newspaper article, Obituary, Levin H. Campbell, New York Times, April 16, 1955
U.S. Army Register, U.S. Army Adjutant General's Office, 1962, Volume 1
Newspaper article, Levin H. Campbell, Ordnance General: Administered Gigantic Armament Program for World War II, Foresaw Rockets Role, by Werner Bamberger, New York Times, November 18, 1976
United States Naval Academy Cemetery Documentation Project, Levin Hicks Campbell Jr. fact sheet dated June 15, 2005, http://www.usna.edu/cemetery/PDF%20Files/Section%203/0336-%20Campbell,%20L.%20H.,%20Jr.pdf
U.S. Army Ordnance Corps web site, Hall of Fame Inductees By Year page, https://web.archive.org/web/20091227055442/http://www.goordnance.apg.army.mil/sitefiles/HOFInducteesbyYear.htm
U.S. Army Ordnance Corps Association web site, awards page, http://www.usaocaweb.org/awards.htm
Generals of World War II

1886 births
1976 deaths
People from Washington, D.C.
United States Naval Academy alumni
Burials at the United States Naval Academy Cemetery
Recipients of the Distinguished Service Medal (US Army)
United States Army personnel of World War I
United States Army generals of World War II
United States Army generals